Ashland is an unincorporated community located in Wayne County, Tennessee, United States.

References 

Unincorporated communities in Wayne County, Tennessee
Unincorporated communities in Tennessee